Khubar is a rural locality (a selo) and the administrative centre of Khubarsky Selsoviet, Kazbekovsky District, Republic of Dagestan, Russia. The population was 1,304 as of 2010. There are 27 streets.

Geography
Khubar is located 13 km southeast of Dylym (the district's administrative centre) by road. Guni and Gertma are the nearest rural localities.

Nationalities 
Avars live there.

References 

Rural localities in Kazbekovsky District